Shaqai Tyreece Steven Forde (born 5 May 2004) is an English professional footballer who plays as a forward for National League club York City, on loan from Watford of the .

Early life
Shaqai Tyreece Steven Forde was born on 5 May 2004 in Watford, Hertfordshire. He is the son of former footballer Fabian Forde and is of Barbadian descent through his father, who played for the Barbados national team.

Career
Forde started his career with Watford in 2012. He made his first-team debut on 8 January 2022 aged 17 as a 74th-minute substitute in a 4–1 away defeat to Leicester City in the 2021–22 FA Cup third round.

In February 2022, Forde joined Southern League Premier Division South club Kings Langley on a one-month loan. He made his debut on 26 February in a 4–0 home win over Wimborne Town in the league, in which he scored a goal 10 minutes into the match, won a penalty kick and recorded an assist. The loan was extended by a further month in March before Forde was recalled by Watford on 1 April to join first-team training, having scored two goals in three appearances for Kings Langley. A successful 2021–22 season saw him named Watford's Young Player of the Season before signing a professional contract with the club in July.

Forde joined National League club York City on 28 December 2022 on loan until the end of the 2022–23 season. He scored in the 90th minute of his debut on 2 January 2023 with a shot into the bottom-right corner of the goal as York drew 2–2 away to Gateshead, after entering the match as a 66th-minute substitute. Five days later, on his first start for the team, he scored a hat trick, helping York City to a 4–1 home win over Maidstone United.

Style of play
Forde plays as a forward and in March 2022 described himself as being "creative, powerful and always looking to go forwards".

Career statistics

Honours
Individual
Watford Young Player of the Season: 2021–22

References

External links
Profile at the York City F.C. website
Profile at the Watford F.C. website

2004 births
Living people
Sportspeople from Watford
Footballers from Hertfordshire
English footballers
Association football forwards
Watford F.C. players
Kings Langley F.C. players
York City F.C. players
Southern Football League players
National League (English football) players
English sportspeople of Barbadian descent
Black British sportspeople